Statistics of League of Ireland in the 1958/1959 season.

Overview
It was contested by 12 teams, and Shamrock Rovers won the championship and qualified to play in the European Cup for next season.

Final classification

Results

Top scorers

Ireland
League of Ireland seasons
1958–59 in Republic of Ireland association football